Zolbin Rural District is in Yamchi District of Marand County, East Azerbaijan province, Iran. At the National Census of 2006, its population was 13,840 in 3,352 households. There were 13,795 inhabitants in 3,955 households at the following census of 2011. At the most recent census of 2016, the population of the rural district was 14,213 in 4,455 households. The largest of its 19 villages was Markid, with 3,104 people.

References 

Marand County

Rural Districts of East Azerbaijan Province

Populated places in East Azerbaijan Province

Populated places in Marand County